Aloma of the South Seas is a 1941 American romantic adventure drama film directed by Alfred Santell and starring Dorothy Lamour and Jon Hall. The film was shot in Technicolor and distributed by Paramount Pictures.

Aloma of the South Seas is based on the 1925 Broadway play of the same name by LeRoy Clemens and John B. Hymer. It is a remake of the 1926 silent film of the same name. Lamour and Hall were the reigning darlings of south sea island adventures of this era having starred in John Ford's The Hurricane. Aloma of the South Seas fits into the romance adventure canon of which Lamour and Hall excelled at.

Plot
Aloma and Prince Tanoa,  are promised by the islanders to wed from their childhood, though the two despise each other and fight.  Tanoa is sent to the United States for an education and does not return for 15 years after the death of his father.  Once crowned, Tanoa's treacherous cousin Revo who has plotted to rule in place of Tanoa since childhood, sees his chance by arming himself and his band with rifles and a light machine gun.

Cast
 Dorothy Lamour as Aloma
 Jon Hall as Tanoa
 Lynne Overman as Corky
 Phillip Reed as Revo
 Katherine DeMille as Kari
 Fritz Leiber as High Priest
 Dona Drake as Nea
 Esther Dale as Tarusa
 Pedro de Cordoba as Raaiti
 John Barclay as Ikali
 Norma Gene Nelson as Aloma as  a child
 Evelyn Del Rio as Nea, as a child
 Scotty Beckett as Tanoa as a child
 William Roy as Revo as a child
 Noble Johnson as Moukali

Awards
The film was nominated for two Academy Awards:

 Best Cinematography
 Best Visual Effects (Farciot Edouart, Gordon Jennings, Louis Mesenkop)

References

External links
 
 

1941 films
1940s adventure drama films
1941 romantic drama films
American adventure drama films
Remakes of American films
American romantic drama films
1940s English-language films
Films scored by Victor Young
American films based on plays
Films directed by Alfred Santell
Films set in Oceania
Paramount Pictures films
Sound film remakes of silent films
1940s American films